Kato Melpeia is a village and a community located in the municipal unit of Andania in Messenia, Greece. The community, which includes the small settlement of Vrachos, has a population of 283 (2011 census).

The village has a local reputation for fishing trout and a mountain spring known as Koube.

References

Populated places in Messenia